Hygromia cinctella, known commonly as the girdled snail, is a small European species of air-breathing land snail, native to the Mediterranean region, that belongs to the terrestrial pulmonate gastropod mollusk subfamily Hygromiinae  of the family Hygromiidae.

Description
For terms see gastropod shell

Hygromia cinctella possesses a 6–7 × 10–12 mm dextral shell composed of 5–6 whorls with shallow sutures that form a high conical top and a flattened underside. The last whorl is sharply keeled. The keel has a characteristic white edge, which 'girdles' the shell, giving the snail its common name. The aperture is simple without a lip inside. The umbilicus is very narrow and almost covered by the reflected columellar margin. The shell colour is variable, from whitish grey to horny brown, often with dark spots, slightly translucent, finely and rather regularly striated. The animal is light greyish or with a yellowish hue, often with darker greyish or brownish head and tentacles.

Variation: In Sicily, colour morphs include green and yellow and reddish, also with colour bands.

Distribution
This snail is native to various European countries around the Mediterranean, including south-east France, southern Switzerland, north-west Croatia, Italy, and Slovenia. It has been introduced and is becoming rapidly established in Great Britain, Austria, Czech Republic, Hungary, Belgium, Germany, the Netherlands and the United States. It has also been recorded in Ireland.

Hygromia cinctella was described as new to Britain by writer Alex Comfort based on specimens he had found in the Paignton area of Devon in April 1950. Subsequently, it was realised that specimens of this species had actually been found in the area from 1945 onwards, but these had been misidentified as the related species and close congener Hygromia limbata, itself a non-native species only discovered in Britain in 1919. It remained predominantly confined to the south-east of England until the mid 1970s, at which point it began to extend its range dramatically. It now has a scattered distribution which extends as far north as Scotland, the first Scottish record being in Glasgow in 2008. In Britain it seems to favour anthropogenic habitats such as gardens, hedgerows and waste ground.

Hygromia cinctella has so far been discovered at two sites in Ireland; waste ground west of Cork City and a garden near Lisburn where it appears to be persisting. The latter population is thought to have been accidentally introduced along with garden plants brought from a site near Bristol.

Behavior

Where they occur, numerous Hygromia cinctella can often be found together in large aggregations. They can be active at night in humid conditions, on paths and flagstones. They can rest high on walls or in the leaf litter and underside of logs. The species can be active in cold weather and survives very cold winters in Central Europe, therefore its recent expansion might have more to do with increased transportation than with climate change.

This species creates and uses love darts in its mating behavior.

References

 Kerney, M.P., Cameron, R.A.D. & Jungbluth, J-H. (1983). Die Landschnecken Nord- und Mitteleuropas. Ein Bestimmungsbuch für Biologen und Naturfreunde, 384 pp., 24 plates.
 Walton, K. (2016). Hygromia cinctella (Draparnaud, 1801) (Mollusca: Gastropoda: Hygromiidae): a new adventive land snail for New Zealand. New Zealand Journal of Zoology 43.
 Van den Neucker T. & Scheers K. (2014). The recent colonisation and rapid spread in Belgium of the alien girdled snail Hygromia cinctella (Gastropoda: Hygromiidae). Journal of Conchology 41(6):779-780. PDF

External links

 Draparnaud, J.-P.-R. (1801). Tableau des mollusques terrestres et fluviatiles de la France. Montpellier / Paris (Renaud / Bossange, Masson & Besson). 1-116
Hygromia cinctella at Animalbase taxonomy,short description, distribution, biology,status (threats), images
Hygromia cinctella images at Encyclopedia of Life
Fauna Europaea Search Distribution
Pall-Gergely, B. 2011. Hygromia cinctella. In: IUCN 2012. IUCN Red List of Threatened Species. Version 2012.2. Downloaded on 22 June 2013.

Hygromia
Hygromiidae
Molluscs of Europe
Gastropods described in 1801